Olena Demydova (born 16 June 1982) is a Ukrainian high jumper.

Career
She competed at the 2010 World Indoor Championships without reaching the final.

Her personal best jump is 1.92 metres (indoor), achieved in February 2010 in Sumy.

References

1982 births
Living people
Ukrainian female high jumpers
Place of birth missing (living people)
20th-century Ukrainian women
21st-century Ukrainian women